Abdulrahman Bello Dambazau   (born 14 March 1954) is a retired Nigerian army general and politician who served as Chief of Army Staff between 2008 and 2010 and in President Muhammadu Buhari's Cabinet as Minister of the Interior from 2015 to 2019.

Early life

Family 
Dambazau was born into an aristocratic military class family of the Fulani Dambazawa clan. His father served in the Colonial Army, and his brothers held senior posts in the army. He also holds the traditional title of Baraden Kano.

Education 
Dambazau's secondary education took place at Barewa College, Zaria, where he graduated in 1974. In 1979, Dambazau attended the US Army Military Police School at Fort McClellan. Dambazau later obtained a bachelor's degree in criminal justice from Kent State University in 1982 and a PhD in criminology from the University of Keele in 1989.

Military career 
In 1974, he proceeded to the Nigerian Defence Academy as a member of the 17 Regular Combatant Course. He was commissioned as a second lieutenant into the Infantry Corps of the Nigerian Army in June 1977.

Command 
Dambazau served as a military police officer, aide-de-camp to the Chief of Army Staff (1979), commanded military police units and served as a special investigator (1984-1985). Dambazau was registrar of the Nigerian Defence Academy from 1993 to 1999. He also served as chief instructor, Support Weapon Wing of the Infantry Centre and School from 1999 to 2001 and later as directing staff at the National War College from 2004 to 2006. From 2007 to 2008, he served as general officer commanding (GOC) 2nd Division, Ibadan.

Chief of Army Staff 
He was appointed Chief of Army Staff in 2008 by President Umaru Yar'Adua. Towards the end of the Yar'Adua administration, the army was accused of attempts to covertly seize power due to Yar'Adua's illness. After Yar'Adua's death, Dambazau was retired from service by President Goodluck Jonathan.

Political career 
Following his retirement in 2010, Dambazau went into politics, later joining the All Progressives Congress (APC). During the 2015 presidential election, he was the head of the security committee of the APC campaign organisation, he later lost out to be appointed National Security Adviser.

Books 
 Criminology and Criminal Justice 1999.
 Military Law Terminologies 1991
 Policing and Terrorism challenges and issues in intelligence 2004.

See also 
List of Hausa people

References

Dambazawa Family
1954 births
Chiefs of Army Staff (Nigeria)
Nigerian Army officers
Nigerian Muslims
Nigerian generals
Nigerian Defence Academy alumni
Barewa College alumni
Nigerian military police officers
Kent State University alumni
Alumni of Keele University
Living people
People from Zaria
Federal ministers of Nigeria
Interior ministers of Nigeria
National Defence College, India alumni